Douglas H. Dority was president of the United Food and Commercial Workers International Union (UFCW), one of North America's largest labor unions.

Early life  
Dority was born on December 9, 1938 in Marion, Virginia.

Activism and career 
Dority's involvement with the union began in the 1960s, when he organized the grocery store where he worked in Lynchburg, Virginia.

Dority worked in various roles for the UFCW (and before 1979, the Retail Clerks International Union) throughout the 1970s, 1980s, and early 1990s. As a field organizer, Dority worked on extended campaigns in both the United States and Canada, and Quebec and southern Ontario in particular.

Upon the retirement of William H. Wynn in 1994, Dority become UFCW international president.

Dority intensified the UFCW's comprehensive campaign against Walmart, investing significant resources in the public relations campaign against the retailer, culminating in a "national day of action" in 2002, where UFCW and other unions held rallies in more than 100 communities throughout the United States. The action was fully backed by the AFL–CIO, where Dority served on the executive-council.

From 2003–04, Dority led the UFCW through one of the largest work stoppages in its history, involving tens of thousands of grocery store workers in protracted strikes in California, Ohio, Kentucky and West Virginia. The action was focused on retaining healthcare benefits.

Healthcare advocate 
Upon retiring from the UFCW in 2004, Dority became the president of America’s Agenda: Health Care for All, a labor-backed interest group dedicated to "winning guaranteed access to affordable, high quality healthcare for every American."

References

Living people
1938 births
People from Marion, Virginia
Trade unionists from Virginia
American trade union leaders
United Food and Commercial Workers people